Li Miao may refer to:

Li Miao (Three Kingdoms) (died 234), Shu Han official 
Li Miao (Tang dynasty) (died 773), Tang dynasty prince

See also
Limiao (disambiguation) for places